Colonel George Hay, 16th Earl of Erroll (13 May 1767 – 14 June 1798) was a Scottish peer and soldier.

Early life

Erroll was the eldest son of James Hay, 15th Earl of Erroll and his second wife, Isabella Carr, the eldest daughter and co-heiress of William Carr of Etal in Northumberland. His elder sister, Lady Augusta Hay (the first wife George Boyle, 4th Earl of Glasgow), succeeded to the Etal estate in 1806. From his father's first marriage to Rebecca Lockhart, he had one half-sibling, Lady Mary Hay, who married Gen. John Scott of Balcomie. His younger brother was William Hay, who served as the Lord High Commissioner to the General Assembly of the Church of Scotland from 1817 to 1819.

His paternal grandparents were William Boyd, 4th Earl of Kilmarnock and Lady Anne Livingston (a daughter of James Livingston, 5th Earl of Linlithgow).

Career
In 1778, he succeeded to the earldom of Erroll following the death of his father. In 1780, he entered the British Army as Cornet, 7th Dragoons. He was made Captain of the 5th Dragoons in 1786 and of the 58th Regiment of Foot in 1792. In 1793, he became a Major of the 78th Regiment of Foot and a Colonel of the 1st Regiment of Foot in 1795.

From 1796 until his death in 1798, he was a Representative Peer for Scotland.

Right to title
Upon the death of his father's aunt, Mary Hay, 14th Countess of Erroll (who died in 1758 without issue), his father James became the 15th Earl of Arroll. Mary's sister Margaret had previously died at Rome in 1723, however she had married James Livingston, 5th Earl of Linlithgow, 4th Earl of Callendar. This regrant was questioned in the House of Lords in 1797. The then Earl of Lauderdale had questioned George, the 16th Earl of Erroll's right to vote at an election of the peers of Scotland. One of the objections made to the title was that the title of Earl of Erroll was claimed through a nomination. It was decided in 1748 in the case of the earldom of Stair that this power of nomination could not be validly exercised after the Union. The House of Lords, after a full inquiry, decided in favour of the 16th Earl of Erroll's right to the title. That the Earl of Erroll holds the honours of his house undoubtedly and without dispute, is clear from the decision of the House of Lords.

Personal life
On 25 January 1790, Lord Erroll was married to Elizabeth Jemima Blake (d. 1831), the sister of Joseph Blake, 1st Baron Wallscourt and a daughter of Joseph Blake of Ardfry (County Galway, Ireland) and Honoria Daly (a daughter of Dermot Daly). Her sister, Joanna Harriet Blake, was the mother of Sir Dominick Daly, the 15th Governor of Prince Edward Island and 7th Governor of South Australia.

Lord Erroll died on 14 June 1798 and was succeeded by his younger brother, William. His widow, the dowager Countess of Erroll, remarried to the Rt.-Hon. John Hookham Frere (a son of John Frere) on 12 September 1816, before her death in 1831.

Ancestors

References 

16
1767 births
1798 deaths
Scottish representative peers